Elections to East Dunbartonshire Council were held on Thursday 4 May, the same day as the 31 other local authorities in Scotland. The election used seven wards created under the Local Governance (Scotland) Act 2004, a reduction of one from 2012, with 22 Councillors being elected, 2 fewer overall. Each ward elected either 3 or 4 members, using the STV electoral system.

The election saw the Scottish National Party elected as the largest group with 7 seats, replacing Labour, which lost all but 2 seats to form the fourth largest group. The Scottish Conservative and Unionist Party gained 4 seats to achieve their highest ever number of councillors, while the Scottish Liberal Democrats gained 3 seats. The Independent councillor Duncan Cumming retained his seat.

Labour councillor Rhondda Geekie, leader of the council since 2007, lost her seat, as did the SNP Group Leader, Ian Mackay.

Election Result

Note: "Votes" are the first preference votes. The net gain/loss and percentage changes relate to the result of the previous Scottish local elections on 3 May 2012. This may differ from other published sources showing gain/loss relative to seats held at dissolution of Scotland's councils.

Ward results

Milngavie
2012: 1 x Liberal Democrat, 1 x SNP, 1 x Labour
2017: 1 x Liberal Democrat, 1 x SNP, 1 x Conservative
2012-2017 Change: 1 x Conservative gain from Labour

Bearsden North
2012: 1 x Independent, 1 x Lib Dem, 1 x SNP
2017: 1 x Independent, 1 x Lib Dem, 1 x Conservative
2012-2017 Change: 1 x Conservative gain from SNP

Bearsden South
2012: 1 x Liberal Democrat, 1 x SNP, 1 x Labour
2017: 1 x Liberal Democrat, 1 x SNP, 1 x Conservative 
2012-2017: Con gain one seat from Lab

Bishopbriggs North and Campsie
2017: 2 x SNP, 1 x Liberal Democrat, 1 x Conservative 
2012-2017 Change: New Ward

Bishopbriggs South
2012: 2 x Labour, 1 x SNP
2017: 1 x Labour, 1 x SNP, 1 x Conservative 
2007-2012 Change: 1 x Conservative gain from Labour

Lenzie & Kirkintilloch South
2012: 1 x Labour, 1 x SNP, 1 x Conservative
2017: 1 x Liberal Democrat, 1 x SNP, 1 x Conservative
2012-2017 Change: 1 x Liberal Democrat gain from Labour

Kirkintilloch East & North & Twechar
2012: 1 x Labour, 1 x EDIA, 1 x SNP
2017: 1 x Labour, 1 x SNP, 1 x Liberal Democrat
2012-2017 Change: 1 x Liberal Democrat gain from EDIA

Aftermath

Following the election, the Conservative and LibDem groups, who together formed a majority on the council, combined to secure the civic offices and various external appointments, the position of Provost being filled by Conservative Councillor Alan Brown and Depute Provost by LibDem Councillor Gary Pews. However, with the 2017 general election just weeks away, the two groups abstained on each other's nominations for the political posts, allowing the SNP to form a minority administration with Cllr Gordan Low as Leader and Cllr Gillian Renwick as Depute.

Thereafter, the Conservative and LibDem groups continued to vote together, and matters came to a head when a revised redundancy policy was pushed through against the opposition of the SNP administration. After a motion by the council leader calling for the policy to be withdrawn was rejected by Conservative and LibDem councillors, the administration stood down on 21 December 2017. 

For the next few months the council functioned without an official administration, and then on 20 March 2018 Conservative Leader Councillor Andrew Polson and Lib Dem Leader Vaughan Moody were elected as Co-Leaders of the new Joint Administration, a first in East Dunbartonshire. Shortly thereafter the new redundancy policy was suspended in the face of potential industrial action.

Post Election Changes 
On 13 November 2021, Bishopbriggs South Conservative councillor, Provost Alan Brown, died suddenly, being succeeded as Provost on 16 December 2021 by his Depute, Bishopbriggs North and Campsie LibDem councillor, Gary Pews. Both the former Provost's seat and the Depute Provost's position were left unfilled for the remainder of the council term. Provost Pews subsequently lost his seat at the 2022 council election.

On 4 January 2022, Bearsden North councillor, Sheila Mechan, announced her resignation from the Conservative group, citing differences with her values at UK, Scottish and Association level, and served out the remainder of the council term as an independent, before standing unsuccessfully in Bearsden South at the 2022 council election.

References 

2017
2017 Scottish local elections
21st century in East Dunbartonshire